16765 Agnesi, provisional designation , is a stony Eunomia asteroid from the middle region of the asteroid belt, approximately 4 kilometers in diameter. It was discovered on 16 October 1996, by Italian-American amateur astronomer Paul Comba at his private Prescott Observatory in Arizona, United States. The asteroid was named after Italian mathematician Maria Gaetana Agnesi.

Orbit and classification 

Agnesi is a member of the Eunomia family, a large group of S-type asteroids and the most prominent family in the central main-belt. It orbits the Sun at a distance of 2.3–2.9 AU once every 4 years and 3 months (1,553 days). Its orbit has an eccentricity of 0.11 and an inclination of 12° with respect to the ecliptic. It was first observed by Haleakala–NEAT/GEODSS, extending the asteroid's observation arc by 32 days prior to its official discovery observation.

Physical characteristics

Diameter and albedo 

According to the NEOWISE mission of NASA's space-based Wide-field Infrared Survey Explorer, Agnesi measures 4.1 kilometers in diameter and its surface has an albedo of 0.28, while the Collaborative Asteroid Lightcurve Link assumes an albedo of 0.21 – derived from 15 Eunomia, the family's largest member and namesake – and calculates a diameter of 3.8 kilometers.

Lightcurves 

A rotational lightcurve of Agnesi was obtained from photometric observations taken by astronomers at the Palomar Transient Factory in September 2013. Lightcurve analysis gave a rotation period of  hours with a brightness variation of  magnitude.

Naming 

This minor planet was named in honor of Italian Maria Gaetana Agnesi (1718–1799), who was the first Western woman to write a widely translated mathematics handbook and the first woman appointed to a professorship at a university in 1750. The official naming citation was published by the Minor Planet Center on 9 January 2001.

References

External links 
 Asteroid Lightcurve Database (LCDB), query form (info )
 Dictionary of Minor Planet Names, Google books
 Asteroids and comets rotation curves, CdR – Observatoire de Genève, Raoul Behrend
 Discovery Circumstances: Numbered Minor Planets (15001)-(20000) – Minor Planet Center
 
 

016765
Discoveries by Paul G. Comba
Named minor planets
19961016